Samsung völlurinn also known as Stjörnuvöllur  is a football stadium in Garðabær. It is located in Reykjavík, and seats 990 individuals in one stand, but can hold about 410 standing spectators additionally. It is the home stadium for Icelandic top-division football team Stjarnan.

External links
 Samsung völlurinn - Nordic Stadiums

Sources 
 

Sports venues in Reykjavík
Football venues in Iceland
Buildings and structures in Capital Region (Iceland)